The Czechoslovakia men's national water polo team was the representative for Czechoslovakia in international men's water polo.

Results

Olympic Games
1920 — 12th place
1924 — 6th place
1928 — 10th place
1936 — 11th place
1992 — 12th place

Notable members

Pavol Steiner (1908–1969), Olympic water polo player, swimmer, and cardiac surgeon

References

Men
Men's national water polo teams
Men's sport in Czechoslovakia